The Ladies Waldegrave is a group portrait by Joshua Reynolds from 1780–81, now in the Scottish National Gallery, who acquired it in 1952. It shows the three daughters of James Waldegrave, 2nd Earl Waldegrave, and Maria Walpole – from left to right, Charlotte (holding a skein of silk), Elizabeth (winding Charlotte's skein onto a card) and Anna (producing tambour lace). Exhibited at the Royal Academy in 1781, it was commissioned the previous year by the subjects' mother in the hope of attracting potential suitors for them – all three of them were then unmarried.

External links
The Ladies Waldegrave - National Galleries of Scotland catalogue entry

Portraits by Joshua Reynolds
1781 paintings
Portraits of women
Paintings in the National Galleries of Scotland
Group portraits by English artists